William Ussher (1718-1780) was an 18th-century Irish Anglican priest.

Ussher was born in County Armagh and educated at Trinity College Dublin. He was ordained deacon in 1741 ; and priest in 1742. He held incumbencies at Kilmactalway and  Clondalkin. He was appointed Archdeacon of Glendalough in 1752 and resigned in 1760.

Notes

18th-century Irish Anglican priests
Archdeacons of Glendalough
Alumni of Trinity College Dublin
People from County Armagh
1718 births
1780 deaths